The Rossetti class of coastal research vessels consists of two units operated by the Italian Marina Militare and named as "Nave Esperienze" (experiencies ship). The vessels are used by Centro Supporto Sperimentazioni Navali (Navy experimental support centre) for technologies research and development trials on ASW weapons.

 Features 
 Raffaele Rossetti (A 5315) is fitted with WASS 533 mm torpedo launcher.
Specifically designed for experiments, new technologies tests in relation to weapon and platform systems, the unit is mainly operated by the Permanent Commission for Experiments on War Materials at La Spezia.
 Vincenzo Martellotta' (A 5320) is fitted with WASS B515/3 324 mm torpedo launcher

Ships

References

External links 
 Rossetti (A 5315) Marina Militare website

Auxiliary research ship classes
Auxiliary ships of the Italian Navy
Ships built in Italy